The Model X was a four-seat passenger car produced by Oldsmobile in 1908, offered as an entry-level alternative to the Model D that appeared in 1901, replacing the Model M. It was the junior companion to the first six-cylinder sedan called the Oldsmobile Model Z also introduced in 1908, and shared most of its technology with the Model M.

History 

The Model X was equipped with a side-valve, in-line  four-cylinder engine developing 32 bhp. The engine was installed in the front, driving the rear wheels through a transmission shaft. The gearbox had three forward gears, with the gearshift lever positioned to the right of the driver.

The brake pedal engaged drum brakes on the rear wheels.

1,100 of the cars were manufactured in 1908; it was cancelled without replacement.

References

Model M
Cars introduced in 1908

Brass Era vehicles